Kanowna was an electoral district of the Legislative Assembly in the Australian state of Western Australia from 1901 to 1950.

The district was located in the Goldfields region, and was based in the town of Kanowna. Upon its creation in 1900 it also included the towns of Bardoc, Windanya, Broad Arrow, Paddington, Black Flag, Mulgarrie, Gindalbie, Kurnalpi, and Bulong. It was held by the Labor Party at all times. When the district was abolished at the 1950 state election, sitting member Emil Nulsen transferred to the new seat of Eyre.

Members

Election results

References

Kanowna